Anolis vescus, the Sierra Del Purial bush anole or Purial bush anole, is a species of lizard in the family Dactyloidae. The species is endemic to Cuba.

References

Anoles
Reptiles of Cuba
Endemic fauna of Cuba
Reptiles described in 1992
Taxa named by Orlando H. Garrido
Taxa named by Stephen Blair Hedges